Meppel (Drents: Möppelt) is a city and municipality in the Northeastern Netherlands. It constitutes the southwestern part of the province of Drenthe. Meppel is the smallest municipality in Drenthe, with a total area of about 57 km² (22 sq mi). As of 1 July 2021, it had a population of 34,506 with over 30,000 inhabitants within city limits.

People born in Meppel are occasionally referred to as Meppeler Muggen in Dutch; this translates as 'mosquitoes from Meppel'. The nickname comes from a traditional folk tale. The people of Meppel thought the church tower was on fire, but after closer inspection, they realised it was only a swarm of mosquitoes.

History 

Meppel developed in the 16th century as an inland harbour for peat transport and distribution. There used to be a lot of waterways in the town, but now only one remains. Meppel received city rights in 1644. On 1 October 1867, Meppel railway station opened to service, drastically improving connectivity in the region. On 1 January 1998, the municipality of Nijeveen, northwest of Meppel, was merged with that of Meppel, retaining the latter name.

Geography 

The Meppelerdiep, the Drentsche Hoofdvaart and the Hoogeveense Vaart connect Meppel to Zwartsluis, Assen and Hoogeveen. To offload professional transport vessels the Omgelegde Hoogeveense Vaart was dug out south of the city. The Meppelerdiep is accessible for boats with a size of 2,000 ton.

The streams Reest and Wold Aa run through the city. The Reest end in the Meppeler Diep. 

The population centres in the municipality are:

 Nijeveen
 Nijentap
 Havelterberg (part)
 Broekhuizen
 Rogat
 De Schiphorst

Transportation

Meppel is served by national and regional train connections with Zwolle to the southwest, which leads to the rest of the country, as well as Leeuwarden and Groningen to the northwest and northeast respectively. The city's station is located on both the Arnhem–Leeuwarden railway (Staatslijn A) and Meppel–Groningen railway (Staatslijn C).

There are regular and frequent bus lines within Meppel and towards Zwolle, Hoogeveen and Assen.

International relations
Meppel is twinned with:

Notable people

 Jan Jansen Bleecker (1641—1732) a merchant and political figure, Mayor of Albany, New York
 Arent Magnin (1825–1888) a Dutch politician in the administration on the Dutch Gold Coast
 Petrus Johannes Waardenburg  (1886 in Nijeveen – 1979) a Dutch ophthalmologist and geneticist; Waardenburg syndrome is named after him
 Ben Nijboer (1915–1999) a Dutch physicist and academic in optics and solid-state physics
 Louise Fresco (born 1952) a Dutch scientist and writer on globally sustainable food production 
 Catrien Santing (born 1958) a Dutch medievalist
 Erik Kwakkel (born 1970) a Dutch scholar who specialises in medieval manuscripts, paleography and codicology
 Albert van der Haar (born 1975) is a Dutch former footballer with almost 500 club caps

The arts
 Petrus Kiers (1807–1875) a Dutch painter, graphic artist and photographer
 Sir Joseph Joel Duveen (1843–1908) an art dealer and benefactor of art galleries 
 Henry J. Duveen (1854–1919) an art dealer
 Eduard Frankfort (1864–1920) a Dutch Jewish painter 
 Jan Mankes (1889–1920) a Dutch painter, sometimes categorized as a symbolic realist
 Jelle Taeke de Boer (1908–1970) a Dutch art collector
 Roelof Frankot (1911–1984) a Dutch painter, a strong relation with the CoBrA movement
 Emmanuel Ohene Boafo (1993) a Dutch-Ghanaian actor, and winner of the Louis d'Or 2021

Gallery

References

External links

Official website

 
Municipalities of Drenthe
Populated places in Drenthe